The State Emergency Service of Ukraine, until December 24, 2012 named the Ministry of Emergencies of Ukraine (Russian: Министерство чрезвычайных ситуаций Украины) is the main executive body tasked with carrying out state policy in the spheres of civil defence, rescue, creating and managing the system of insurance fund documentation, utilization of radioactive wastes, protection of population and territory in emergency situations, emergency prevention and response, liquidation in the aftermath, and the Chernobyl catastrophe. 

It is abbreviated as ДСНС [України]. It also directly administers the zone of alienation located just north of Kyiv.

Under the jurisdiction of the Ministry of Internal Affairs, the agency's motto is "To prevent. To rescue. To help." (Russian: Предотвратить. Спасти. Помочь)

History

The former ministry was created in 1996 with the merger of the state civil defense body and the Ukrainian ministry in charge of protecting the population from the consequences of the Chernobyl catastrophe. Until 1991, the latter was a state committee of the Cabinet of Ministers of the Ukrainian SSR, while state civil defense was part of the USSR's All-Union civil defense network.

In 2003, the ministry took over control of the firefighting service, previously under the jurisdiction of the Ministry of Internal Affairs (militsiya). The ministry had been part of the military reserve of the Ukrainian armed forces, but after the 2003 reform and fire services merger, all militarized formations were dissolved, and in 2005, the agency became officially non-military and focused on rescue services.

Until the administrative reform of December 9, 2010, the body was called Ministry of Ukraine in emergencies and the protection of the population from the consequences of the Chernobyl disaster. After the reform, three major central executive power bodies were directly subordinated to it:
 State service of mining supervision and industrial safety of Ukraine (Russian: Державна служба гірничого нагляду та промислової безпеки України)
 State agency of Ukraine of the administration of the zone of alienation (Russian: Государственное агентство Украины по управлению зоной отчуждения)
 State inspection of technogenic safety of Ukraine (Russian: Государственная инспекция техногенной безопасности Украины)
Other agencies
 State department of fire-prevention security (see firefighting)
 State search and rescue aviation service: Ukraviaposhuk
 State hydro-meteorological service
 State department of the insurance documentation fund of the Ministry

On December 24, 2012, the Ministry of Emergencies of Ukraine was transformed into the State Emergency Service and placed under jurisdiction of the Ministry of Defence. On 25 April 2014, the service was transferred to the Ministry of Internal Affairs.

Structure

Main body 
 Central Bureau of Emergency Situations

Specialized formations
 State militarized mining rescue brigade (Kryvyi Rih)
 Dnipro militarized mining rescue brigade

Other agencies
 Ukrainian Hydro-meteorological Center
 Ukrainian Aviation Meteorological Center
 Main Aviation Coordination Center of search and rescue
 "Rescuer"-Inform Information Analytical Center
 Center of Civil Security 112
 Mobile Rescue Center (Kyiv)
 Odessa Sanatorium (Odessa)

List of Heads of the State Emergency Service

Former agency executives (prior to 2012 reorganisation)

List of former chiefs of State Civil Defense

List of Ministers of Emergencies

Ranks

Medals

State Emergency Service Aviation

The Special Aviation Unit and Operational Rescue Service of the State Emergency Service (Спеціальний авіаційний загін оперативно-рятувальної служби цивільного захисту) is based in the city of Nizhyn.

The Special Aviation Unit can work independently or in cooperation with other State Emergency Service units to protect population and territory, material and cultural values and the environment during emergencies, especially for work performed under difficult conditions.

See also

Fire protection
Fire safety
Firefighting
Search and rescue
State Emergency Service
Ministry of Emergency Situations (Russia)

References

External links 
 
 
 Law of Ukraine on Civil Defense Forces

 
Emergencies
Ministries established in 1991
Emergencies
1991 establishments in Ukraine
Emergency services in Ukraine